Restoration Day, more commonly known as Oak Apple Day or Royal Oak Day, was an English, Welsh and Irish public holiday, observed annually on 29 May, to commemorate the restoration of the Stuart monarchy in May 1660. In some parts of England the day is still celebrated. It has also been known as Shick Shack Day, or Oak and Nettle Day.

In 1660, the English Parliament passed into law "An Act for a Perpetual Anniversary Thanksgiving on the Nine and Twentieth Day of May", declaring 29 May a public holiday "for keeping of a perpetual Anniversary, for a Day of Thanksgiving to God, for the great Blessing and Mercy he hath been graciously pleased to vouchsafe to the People of these Kingdoms, after their manifold and grievous Sufferings, in the Restoration of his Majesty..."

The public holiday was abolished under the Anniversary Days Observance Act 1859, but the date retains some significance in local and institutional customs. It is, for example, still observed as Founder's Day by the Royal Hospital Chelsea, which was founded by Charles II in 1681.

In Ireland, Oak Apple Day was made a public holiday under the Act of Settlement 1662.

Ceremonies
Traditional celebrations to commemorate the event often entailed the wearing of oak apples (a type of plant gall, possibly known in some parts of the country as a "shick-shack") or sprigs of oak leaves, in reference to the occasion after the Battle of Worcester in September 1651, when Charles II escaped the Roundhead army by hiding in an oak tree near Boscobel House. Anyone who failed to wear a sprig of oak risked being pelted with bird's eggs or thrashed with nettles. In Sussex, those not wearing oak were liable to be pinched, giving rise to the unofficial name of "Pinch-bum Day"; similarly it was known as "Bumping Day" in Essex.

In Upton Grey, Hampshire, after the church bells had been rung at 6 am the bell-ringers used to place a large branch of oak over the church porch, and another over the lychgate. Smaller branches were positioned in the gateway of every house to ensure good luck for the rest of the year.

Modern events
Events still take place at Upton-upon-Severn in Worcestershire, Marsh Gibbon in Buckinghamshire, Great Wishford in Wiltshire (when villagers gather wood in Grovely Wood), Aston-on-Clun in Shropshire and Membury in Devon. The day has been marked in the past by re-enactment activities at Moseley Old Hall, West Midlands, one of the houses where Charles II hid in 1651.

At Fownhope in Herefordshire the Heart of Oak Society organise an annual event, where members of the society gather at the local pub and march through the village holding flower and oak leaf decorated sticks, whilst following the society banner and a brass band. The march goes first to the church for a service, and then to houses who host refreshments. The Heart of Oak Society was previously a friendly society, but had to reform in 1989 to keep the tradition going. Although Oak Apple Day celebrations have decreased in popularity and knowledge, Fownhope has managed to keep the event going, increasing in popularity and turn-out every year.

At All Saints' Church, Northampton, a statue of Charles II is garlanded with oak leaves at noon every Oak Apple Day, followed by a celebration of the Holy Communion according to the Book of Common Prayer.

Oak Apple Day is also celebrated in the Cornish village of St Neot. The vicar leads a procession through the village, he is followed by the Tower Captain holding the Oak bough. A large number of the villagers follow walking to the Church. A story of the history of the event is told and then the vicar blesses the branch. The Tower Captain throws the old branch down from the top of the tower and a new one is hauled to the top. Everyone is then invited to the vicarage gardens for refreshments and a barbecue. Up to 12 noon villagers wear a sprig of "red" (new) oak and in the afternoon wear a sprig of "Boys Love" (Artemisia abrotanum); tradition dictates that the punishment for not doing this results in being stung by nettles.

In 2021, Oak Apple Day was celebrated within sight of Charles II's former home of Windsor Castle at Eton Wick.

See also
Push penny
Saint George's Day in England

References

Footnotes

Bibliography

External links
English culture: Oak Apple Day
Customs at Great Wishford
Chelsea Hospital Oak Apple Day, British Pathé report, 1947.

English traditions
English folklore
Festivals in England
May observances
Apple festivals